A crepulja is a shallow clay container with a little hole in the middle. The container diameter is between 25 - 60 cm, the height of the pan 7 – 13 cm, and the walls thickness 3 - 5 cm.  The clay is treaded by stepping over the mud, mixed with raw horse dung, goat hairs, oat straw or chaff. The container is modelled by hand. The finished pan is burnished using wet hands or coated with rarified
mud. This could also be done with watered dung. Drying happens in the open for several months, finally the container is fired by placing it over the fire with the inner surface towards the fire.

It is put on fire until well heated, then lifted with a hook, and dough is put into it and covered with a sač. The sač is covered with ashes and live coals. In that way the bread is baked on both sides: on the lower side from the heated crepulja and on top from live coals.

See also
 List of cooking vessels

References

Cooking vessels
Montenegrin cuisine
Serbian cuisine